Isabel Chitas (born 2 June 1949) is a Portuguese sports shooter. She competed in the women's 25 metre pistol event at the 1984 Summer Olympics.

References

1949 births
Living people
Portuguese female sport shooters
Olympic shooters of Portugal
Shooters at the 1984 Summer Olympics
Place of birth missing (living people)